Raouf Bouzaiene (born 16 August 1970 in Sousse) is a retired Tunisian footballer. He played as a left-back.

Bouzaiene was part of the Tunisian national team at the 2002 World Cup, scoring Tunisia's goal in the 1–1 draw against Belgium.

International career

International goals
Scores and results list Tunisia's goal tally first.

References

External links
 
 

1970 births
Living people
Tunisian footballers
People from Sousse
Tunisian expatriate footballers
Stade Lavallois players
LB Châteauroux players
Genoa C.F.C. players
Club Africain players
Étoile Sportive du Sahel players
Tunisian Ligue Professionnelle 1 players
Ligue 2 players
Serie B players
2002 FIFA World Cup players
Tunisia international footballers
1994 African Cup of Nations players
2000 African Cup of Nations players
2002 African Cup of Nations players
Expatriate footballers in France
Expatriate footballers in Italy
Association football defenders